Heligmosomidae is a family of nematodes belonging to the order Rhabditida.

Genera

Genera:
 Citellinema Hall, 1916
 Citellinoides Dikmans, 1939
 Dessetia Genov & Janchev, 1981
 Heligmosomoides
 Nippostrongylus Lane, 1923

References

Nematodes